"Last Train to London" is a song from the English rock band Electric Light Orchestra (ELO), the fifth track from their album Discovery.

The song was released in 1979 in the UK as a double A-side single with "Confusion". It peaked at number 8 in the UK Singles Chart. However, in the US the two songs charted separately, with "Confusion" in late 1979 followed by "Last Train to London" in early 1980. It peaked at number 39 on the Billboard Hot 100.

Critical reception
Billboard described the song as having a "catchy pop melody with Beatlesque vocal qualities and a smooth layered sound."  Cash Box said that the song has "a frothy pop melody" and "a bouncy R&B-tinged rhythm line," making it sound somewhat like Heatwave's 1977 single "Boogie Nights." Record World said that "The electronic dance beat and lilting vocals are as timely as they are engaging."

Spanish release
In Spain the single was released with the Spanish title "Último tren a Londres".

Chart history

Cover versions
 In 2002 British girl group Atomic Kitten sampled the hook of the song in their single "Be with You". The song was released as a double A-side with the song "The Last Goodbye". The single peaked at No. 2 in the UK.

References

External links
 [ Review at allmusic]

1979 singles
1980 singles
Electric Light Orchestra songs
Songs written by Jeff Lynne
Song recordings produced by Jeff Lynne
Songs about London
Songs about trains
1979 songs
Jet Records singles